Steve Wieck (also credited as Stephan Wieck) is best known as one of the founders of the publishing company, White Wolf, Inc. He is also one of the original writers of Mage: The Ascension. Wieck is a co-founder of DriveThruRPG which later merged with RPGNow to become OneBookShelf. Wieck is currently the CEO of OneBookShelf.

Career

White Wolf 
Steve Wieck and his brother Stewart Wieck had their first published work in 1986 as the adventure The Secret in the Swamp for Villains & Vigilantes from FGU. Later that same year, while they were still in high school, the brothers began self-publishing their own magazine, Arcanum; Stewart soon retitled the magazine as White Wolf, publishing the first issue in August 1986. The Wiecks were fans of Elric, and named their magazine after him. Stephan Wieck wrote the Shadowrun adventure Queen Euphoria (1990). The Wiecks had befriended the company Lion Rampant, and when that company encountered financial trouble, White Wolf and Lion Rampant decided to merge into the new White Wolf Game Studio, with Stewart Wieck and Mark Rein-Hagen as co-owners. 

Steve graduated from the Georgia Institute of Technology in 1991 and left White Wolf to begin some MBA-equivalent training at GE. Steve returned from GE with two years of business training, and Stewart made Steve the CEO of White Wolf in 1993. 

The company encountered economic problems in 1995–1996, which caused a falling out between Rein-Hagen and the Wiecks, resulting in Rein-Hagen leaving White Wolf. 

Steve co-designed the Exalted role-playing game with Robert Hatch and Justin Achilli, and the game was published in 2001. 

Steve relinquished his role as CEO in 2002, and Mike Tinney became the new president.

CCP Games 
In November 2006, it was announced that CCP Games had entered a merger agreement with White Wolf Publishing. Steve left White Wolf in 2007 to take a seat on CCP's board of directors. He served on CCP's board of directors for 9 years.

DriveThruRPG and OneBookShelf 
In 2004, Mike Todd, Chris McDonough, and Wieck created DriveThruRPG, an online RPG PDF distributor. In 2006, DriveThruRPG merged with RPGNow, another online RPG distributor. The merger formed OneBookShelf. , Wieck remains the CEO of OneBookShelf.

In July 2022, Roll20 and OneBookShelf announced a merger between the two companies. This merger will combine the content libraries of both companies and make "OneBookShelf's PDF libraries accessible within Roll20". Ankit Lai, CEO of Roll20, will become the new company's CEO and Wieck will become president of the new company and join Roll20's board of directors. The combined company's name has not yet been announced.

References

Living people
Mage: The Ascension
Role-playing game designers
White Wolf game designers
Year of birth missing (living people)